The third inversion of a seventh chord is the voicing in which the seventh of the chord is the bass note and the root a major second above it. In the third inversion of a G-dominant seventh chord, the bass is F — the seventh of the chord — with the root, third, and fifth stacked above it (the root now shifted an octave higher), forming the intervals of a second, a fourth, and a sixth above the inverted bass of F, respectively. In figured bass, it is referred to as a  chord.

According to The American History and Encyclopedia of Music:

Note that any voicing above the bass is allowed. A third inversion chord must have the seventh chord factor in the bass, but it may have any arrangement of the root, third, and fifth above that, including doubled notes, compound intervals, and omission (F-G-B-D, F-B-D-G', F-G-B-D-G', etc.)

See also

Figured bass
Root position
Inversion (music)
First inversion
Second inversion
Fourth inversion

References

Chord factors
Chords
Voicing (music)